Hawley is a village in the civil parish of Sutton-at-Hone and Hawley in the Borough of Dartford, Kent, England. It is located 3 miles south of Dartford & 3.8 miles north east of Swanley.

Transport

Railway
The nearest National Rail stations to Hawley are Farningham Road, located 2.2 miles away and Dartford, located 3 miles away.

Buses
Hawley is served by the Arriva Kent Thameside route 414, which connects it with Dartford.

References

Villages in Kent